Frederick Gottlieb is a former Bahamian politician and currently a Bahamian lawyer.
Frederick Gottlieb was born in Pine Ridge, Grand Bahama, Bahamas, to Dr. and Mrs. Ejnar Gottlieb. Dr. Gottlieb was a doctor in Grand Bahama and Abaco who was employed by the Abaco Lumber Company owned by the late Wallace Groves the founder of the Bahamas second city Freeport in Grand Bahama.

Early career
Fred Gottlieb became an active member of the Free National Movement (FNM) at an early age. In 1987, in a close run-off election for the party nomination in South Abaco, he narrowly defeated Robert Sweeting and won his party's nomination. In the 1987 election, he defeated PLP incumbent Edison Key to win the seat, but his party suffered a national defeat, and Fred Gottlieb served as an Opposition MP during his term in office.

In 1992, the Abaco area was divided into three constituencies; Fred Gottlieb ran against Edison Key of the Progressive Liberal Party (PLP) for the Marsh Harbour seat. Edison Key narrowly defeated Fred Gottlieb in the contest, but Gottlieb's party won the national election and ended the PLP's twenty-five year rule.

After his loss Gottlieb focused more on his law practice. He has still been involved in the party, speaking at party conventions, and local party rallies.

He has served as former chair of the Water and Sewage Board, chair of Bahamasair and chair of Bahamas Electricity Corporation (B.E.C).

References
The Nassau Guardian, May 2, 2003 – Symonette's race a non-issue - Nottage Mentions that Gottlieb was elected to Parliament, without specifying the date.
Sabre Holdings, June 7, 2000 – Press release identifies Fred Gottlieb as chair of Bahamasair.

Year of birth missing (living people)
Living people
Members of the House of Assembly of the Bahamas
Free National Movement politicians
People from Grand Bahama
People from South Abaco
21st-century Bahamian lawyers